Eyes on You may refer to:

"Eyes on You" (Jay Sean song), 2004
"Eyes on You" (Chase Rice song), 2018
Eyes on You (EP), an EP by Got7